Rand Saad Al-Mashhadani (born 11 August 1994) is an Iraqi archer. She competed in the individual event at the 2012 Summer Olympics.

References 

Iraqi female archers
1994 births
Living people
Archers at the 2012 Summer Olympics
Olympic archers of Iraq
Archers at the 2010 Asian Games
Archers at the 2014 Asian Games
Asian Games competitors for Iraq